Dorndorfer Bach is a small river of Hesse, Germany. It upstream until the confluence of the Watzenbach is also called Kieselbach. The Dorndorfer Bach flows into the Salzbach in Thalheim.

See also
List of rivers of Hesse

Rivers of Hesse
Rivers of the Westerwald
Rivers of Germany